Valérie Maltais (born July 4, 1990) is a Canadian short track speed skater and speed skater. She has won six world championship medals, including finishing second overall in 2012.

Career

Early career
She began skating at the age of 6 and, in 2009, was the Canadian Champion in the 1500m. In that same year, she received a bronze medal in relay at the World Short Track Championships. She was set to compete for Canada at the 2010 Winter Olympics in the Ladies' 3000m relay. Maltais did not compete in the relay however but did compete in the 1,500 m where she finished fourteenth.

Post-Olympics, Maltais succeeded at the 2012 World Championships. She won a bronze medal in a photo finish in the 1,000 m. With her success, she qualified for the 3,000 m superfinal, where she lapped her entire opposition and won the gold medal. Due to her results, she also won the silver medal in the overall standings at the competition. In the finals of the relay, however, teammate Marie-Ève Drolet fell and put the Canadians in fourth place, and Maltais just missed winning a fourth medal at the event.

2014 Sochi Olympics
Going into the 2014 Winter Olympics, Maltais was no longer a rookie Olympic competitor, though she still found herself as the youngest member of the women's short track team at those games. At the previous games she had not been invited to skate on the relay team and says that she was paralyzed with nerves, whereas going into these games she now found strength in her favour 1,000 and 1,500 m metre events where she liked leading from the front. Maltais talked about her strategy, saying that "Last year, I spent more time at the front, and I think that it's a strategy that works well for me. I have to learn to change my laps and to better control my speed, but I think that this could be a good strategy." This strategy helped her at the national trials, and Maltais competed in all three individual events and the relay in Sochi.

2018 Winter Olympics
In August 2017, Maltais was named to Canada's 2018 Winter Olympics team.

2022 Winter Olympics
In January 2022, Maltais was named to her first Olympic team in long track speed skating. Maltais would go on to win the gold medal as part of the team pursuit event. In doing so, she became only the fourth athlete to win Olympic medals in both short- and long-track speed skating, following Eric Flaim, Jorien ter Mors and Ruslan Zakharov.

References

External links

1990 births
Living people
French Quebecers 
Canadian female speed skaters
Canadian female short track speed skaters
Inline speed skaters
Olympic short track speed skaters of Canada
Olympic gold medalists for Canada
Olympic silver medalists for Canada
Olympic medalists in short track speed skating
Olympic medalists in speed skating
Short track speed skaters at the 2010 Winter Olympics
Short track speed skaters at the 2014 Winter Olympics
Short track speed skaters at the 2018 Winter Olympics
Medalists at the 2014 Winter Olympics
Medalists at the 2022 Winter Olympics
Roller speed skaters at the 2015 Pan American Games
World Short Track Speed Skating Championships medalists
Sportspeople from Saguenay, Quebec
Pan American Games competitors for Canada
Speed skaters at the 2022 Winter Olympics
Olympic speed skaters of Canada
21st-century Canadian women